UFO is a four-part television documentary series about unidentified flying objects, produced by J.J. Abrams' production company, Bad Robot Productions. The series aired on Showtime in 2021.

See also
 List of Showtime original programming

References

External links
 

2021 American television series debuts
American documentary television series
Showtime (TV network) original programming
UFO-related television